Palabek Kal is a town in Palabek county, Lamwo district, Northern Uganda. Palabek Kal serves as headquarter for Palabek county. The county has three sub counties. Palabek Kal, Palabek Gem, Palabek Ogili both in Lamwo District. 

Populated places in Northern Region, Uganda
Cities in the Great Rift Valley
Lamwo District